Erythrochiton nigrosignatum is a species of beetle in the family Cerambycidae. It was described by Zajciw in 1957.

References

Heteropsini
Beetles described in 1957